École secondaire Gabriel-Dumont is a public French first language high school in London, Ontario, Canada. It is located in south-east London on Evans Blvd, in the Summerside subdivision. It is named after Métis leader Gabriel Dumont. The president of the school is Anabelle Stinson.

Proportionate to its size, London has an extremely small francophone population; however, it qualifies for French language services under the French Language Services Act, and also qualifies to have French schools. While there have been French elementary schools in London since 1972, it was not until 1979 that a French high school was created. Originally it was only one class, at London Central Secondary School. Over time, the program grew to include a wide variety of subjects and became known as Le Module scolaire de langue française (MSLF). Due to changes in the organizational structure of the education system in Ontario, the MSLF became Gabriel-Dumont in 1998.

It would subsequently move out of Central, and into the same building as the Catholic school. The project that would become CDL had been in the works for over a decade; however, it was stymied by political fighting.  In 2007, it was announced that Gabriel-Dumont would move from its location within the CDL project and into its own building in September 2012 on Evans Blvd in the Summerside subdivision.

The school grades are different from most schools in Southwestern Ontario, which start at Grade 9 and end in Grade 12. Gabriel-Dumont holds classes from grades 7 to 12.

Notable alumni 
Notable alumni include:
Shad, hip hop musician (École secondaire Gabriel-Dumont)
Andrew Gunadie, video producer/musician (École secondaire Gabriel-Dumont)
Arielle Kayabaga, Member of Parliament for London West (École secondaire Gabriel-Dumont)

See also
List of high schools in Ontario

External links
École secondaire Gabriel-Dumont (in French)
CyberQuartier:  the school's online student portal (in French)
l'Assemblée de la francophonie de l'Ontario (AFO) (in French)
 ACFO-London-Sarnia (in French)

High schools in London, Ontario
French-language high schools in Ontario